The Wonder Weeks is the English translation of the Dutch book Oei, ik groei! (literal translation: Ai, I'm growing!) by physical anthropologist Hetty van de Rijt and ethologist and developmental psychologist Frans Plooij. Originally published in 1992, it has been republished several times, with an updated 6th edition published in 2019. Drawing on many years of observation and analysis of infant development, it gives parents practical guidance to help their baby's cognitive development through its predictable stages or 'leaps'. Its theoretical basis is Perceptual Control Theory, which predicts and explains the observed phenomena. Questioning of the research with mother-infant dyads has received some attention in the press and social media, though sometimes reducing it to a matter of sleep schedules. The research has been replicated several times, and Brazelton found it to be mutually confirmatory with his own work. The book continues to be popular, and the publisher has produced a mobile app based on the book.

Claims 
According to the book, babies go through 10 predictable 'leaps' in their cognitive development during the first 20 months of life. These correspond to successive developments in the growing brain, as manifested in the child's ability to perceive and then to control a new kind of perceptions at a higher level of the perceptual hierarchy.

This book derives from almost five decades of research, beginning at first with ethological observation of free-living chimpanzee mothers and infants undertaken in 1971 in cooperation with Jane Goodall, and then extending to more elaborate research with human mothers and infants. The existence of regular 'regression periods' and their correlation with stages of cognitive development are well documented in the literature of ethology and child psychology, and the findings underlying the book have been replicated in different countries and cultures by several independent research groups. Further corroboration comes from independent lines of investigation into periodicity of early childhood illness, 
peaks in the ages of infant mortality attributed to SIDS, 
and disorders of the central nervous system in infants. 
Brazelton and Plooij found that their independent lines of research were mutually corroborating.
 The leaps are predicted to occur at approximately 5, 8, 12, 19, 26, 37, 46, 55, 64 and 75 weeks old. A great deal of the observed variability is because development starts with conception, not with birth, and gestation is of variable duration. (Weeks are counted from the due date if the child is premature.) Development of specific skills that become possible with each higher order of perception is also variable. Beyond the scope of the book, additional regression periods have been documented, even into the teen years.

Theoretical basis
These findings conform to and help to confirm the comprehensive theoretical and research framework of Perceptual Control Theory (PCT), which was the orienting framework for the investigation from the outset. 

According to Perceptual Control Theory, the brain controls a perception by means of setting the preferences (termed reference values) for the lower-level perceptions that go into constructing it. As the baby's brain grows it develops the capacity to take previously familiar perceptions as inputs from which it constructs new perceptions of a higher order in the hierarchy. The brain must then develop preferences for these new perceptions and learn to control them by setting reference values for the lower-level input perceptions. During the time that the brain is reorganizing, the kinds of experiences which the infant had grown confident controlling at that lower level of perception are destabilized, but before long learning from experience gives rise to new cognitive and behavioral capabilities. Consequently, a 'leap' consist of two phases: A phase where the baby 'regresses' as though to a younger age, seeking secure closeness with the mother and being generally 'cranky', due to cognitive disruption of previously gained competencies, followed by a period where the baby is generally happy and outgoing, exploring new experiences with the newly gained cognitive skills.

Effects of stressful conditions
Other conditions may cause insecurity and frustration in a child's life, "circumstances such as chaos, travel, moving house" and the like. The research underlying this book carefully controlled for such extraneous disturbances. Healthy, stable families were selected because the aim was to "understand normal development before venturing into understanding pathology". When there are "special parental conditions, such as rigid schedule care or depression and phobias, ... [d]ips instead of peaks in crying ... have been found at the regression periods. Peaks in crying could be found only in the first few months ... because the crying is practically nonexistent thereafter ... [and] under these special circumstances ... smiling appears to take over from crying as a means to try and get mother's attention." Such difficulties and their effects on the developing child are serious matters for further research, but are not within the scope of this book.

Controversy 

As a PhD student, Carolina de Weerth, proposed to replicate the ethological findings with four mother-infant dyads. She measured emotional instability through direct observation of four behavior categories: ‘crying’, ‘fretting/fussing’, ‘smile’, and ‘body contact’. She found correlations of behavior categories with the predicted regression periods for only one of the four infants. After presenting these results in her PhD dissertation, she published them jointly with her dissertation supervisor, Paul van Geert. They concluded that age-related regression periods do not exist and that infant development is chaotic, with wide individual variation. This conclusion, which is consistent with their commitment to the application of mathematical concepts of chaos and complex systems to psychology, was immediately disputed by Plooij. Subsequently they published her data on cortisol levels measured in saliva  considered as a measure of stress in these same four infants.

De Weerth's methodology has been criticized as a failure to replicate the research. Plooij argued that care was not taken to select subjects free from external sources of stress. Two of the mothers imposed strict schedules of sleeping, contact, and feeding, with the infant placed for hours in a playpen. This failed to replicate the research protocol calling for a "child-following" mother, and obviated any naturalistic record of maternal contacts in response to the infant's expressions of wanting contact. One of these two infants was separated from her mother for ten days because the mother "was not up to it". This infant also received at least 8 months of physiotherapy. The mother of another of the four had been in therapy for depression prior to the birth, and experienced post-partum depression and diverse phobias. Depression has well-documented adverse effects on the interactions that are central to replicating this work, as well as on the healthy development of the child. De Weerth's observational data consequently showed the predicted regression periods only for the fourth mother-infant dyad, who were relatively free from extrinsic sources of stress. 

The controversial study by de Weerth has not been replicated. The findings of Plooij and his colleagues have been replicated by three independent research groups.

No rejoinder has been published to the several 2003 refutations. Woolmore and Richer went so far as to say that "studies that fail to find regression periods must be carefully scrutinized to ensure they have not simply failed to see through the 'noise' in their data, such that they have mistaken their own failure to find the phenomenon for the phenomenon's nonexistence."

References 

Developmental psychology
Dutch books
Translation publications